Predrag Tomić (Serbian Cyrillic: Предраг Томић; born 1953) is a Serbian retired footballer.

References

1953 births
Living people
Footballers from Belgrade
Serbian footballers
Yugoslav footballers
Yugoslav First League players
FK Partizan players
NK Olimpija Ljubljana (1945–2005) players
OFK Beograd players
Association football defenders